Blastobasis basipectenella is a moth in the  family Blastobasidae. It is found in Thailand.

The length of the forewings is 6–6.1 mm. The forewings have greyish-brown and pale greyish-brown scales, each tipped with white. The hindwings are pale grey.

Etymology
The species name is derived from Latin basis (meaning base) and pecten (meaning comb) and refers to the comb-like process arising from the base of the lower part of the valva.

References

Moths described in 2003
Blastobasis